Jeanne Elizabeth Pearl Kohl-Welles (née Jean Elizabeth Pearl Kohl; October 19, 1942) is an American politician and academic. Since January 2016 she has served as a member of the King County Council from the 4th district. She previously served as a member of the Washington State Senate from 1994 to 2015 and the Washington House of Representatives from 1992 to 1994.

Early life and education
Kohl-Welles was born in Madison, Wisconsin. She earned a Bachelor of Arts and Master of Arts in education from the California State University, Northridge, followed by a Master of Arts and PhD in sociology from the University of California, Los Angeles.

Career
Kohl-Welles was a teacher in the Los Angeles Unified School District. She has also worked as a lecturer at Chapman College; University of California, Irvine; California State University, Long Beach; and California State University, Fullerton. She was a program manager for the United States Department of Education and later worked as a visiting professor at Pacific Lutheran University.

Outside of academics, Kohl-Welles has provided expert testimony in Title IX lawsuits.

A member of the Democratic Party, from 1994 to 2016 she represented the 36th district in the Washington State Senate, which includes Ballard, Belltown, Blue Ridge, Crown Hill, Greenwood, Magnolia, and Queen Anne Hill neighborhoods of Seattle as well as the north half of Downtown Seattle. The district also takes the western half of Lake Union. Jeanne Kohl-Welles was appointed to the State Senate in 1994.

From 1992 to 1994, she was a member of the Washington House of Representatives.

Awards and honors
Kohl-Welles was a recipient of the 2009 Fuse "Sizzle" Awards Committee Chair of the Year Award. The award recognized Kohl-Welles work on predatory lending reforms, updates to strengthen and simplify Washington State's Consumer Protection Act, and good government reforms to prevent trade associations from diverting workers compensation funds into political campaigns.

Criticism
Using data and projections compiled by the Washington State Office of Financial Management, Freedom Foundation aggregated bills introduced in the 2008 legislative session in order to determine the total increased taxes and fees proposed by each individual legislator, as primary or co-sponsor, would bring to taxpayers over a ten-year period. Kohl-Welles topped the list of legislators. Her bills have been predicted to bring total of $214,327,749,698 of increases in taxes and fees to Washington taxpayers.

References

External links 
Biography at HistoryLink
Sen. Kohl-Welles bio, Senate Democratic Caucus, Washington State

1942 births
Living people
Democratic Party Washington (state) state senators
Pacific Lutheran University faculty
University of California, Los Angeles alumni
Women state legislators in Washington (state)
King County Councillors
21st-century American politicians
21st-century American women politicians
American women academics
Democratic Party members of the Washington House of Representatives